Belliella kenyensis  is a Gram-negative and aerobic bacterium from the genus of Belliella which has been isolated from lake sediments from the alkaline Lake Elmenteita from the Kenyan Rift Valley in Kenya.

References

External links 

Type strain of Belliella kenyensis at BacDive -  the Bacterial Diversity Metadatabase

Cytophagia
Bacteria described in 2015